Mean Machine is the eighth album by German rock band Lucifer's Friend, released in 1982.

Track listing

Personnel
 John Lawton – lead vocals
 Peter Hesslein – lead guitars, backing vocals
 Peter Hecht – keyboards
 Dieter Horns – bass
 Herbert Bornhold – drums

External links
 Mean Machine review & credits at AllMusic.com
 Mean Machine at Discogs.com

1981 albums
Lucifer's Friend albums